Ahmet Aslan (born 1971 in Hozat, Tunceli) is a Turkish musician of Zaza descent. He performs classical songs in Turkish, Zazaki and Kurdish.

Between 1993 and 1996, he studied at the Istanbul Technical University Conservatory. He has been living in Germany since 1996.

By combining classic guitar and bağlama, Aslan created an instrument which he named Di-Tar. During the development process, after taking the opinions of artists such as Martin Greve, Paco Peña, Carlo Domeniconi, and Antonis Anissegos, he made further progress with the help of Süleyman Aslan (Dutar Saz Evi), an instrument master.

Solo albums 
 Budala Aurasi (2019)
 Va u Waxt  (Rüzgâr ve Zaman) (2004)
 Veyvé Mılaketu (Meleklerin Dansı) (2007)
 Na-Mükemmel (Imperfect) (2015)
 Dornağê Budelay (Aura of Madness) 2019

References

External links 
 

1971 births
Living people
People from Hozat
Zaza_people
Turkish people of Kurdish descent
Kurdish musicians